Mislav Matić (born 6 January 2000) is a Croatian footballer playing as a centre-back who plays for HNK Šibenik.

Career

Youth career and Lokomotiva Zagreb
Until the age of 17, Matić played for Croatian Third Football League side Junak Sinj before joining Lokomotiva Zagreb in the top flight.

Rudeš
In 2019, he was sent on loan to Croatian Second Football League team Rudeš until the end of the season.

Mynai
In 2020, he signed for Mynai in the Ukrainian top flight.

Šibenik
In summer 2022, he signed for Šibenik.

Personal life
Matić's older brother, Bernardo, is also a footballer.

References

External links
 Mislav Matić at Soccerway

2000 births
Living people
People from Sinj
Association football central defenders
Croatian footballers
Croatia youth international footballers
NK Rudeš players
FC Mynai players
HNK Šibenik players
First Football League (Croatia) players
Ukrainian Premier League players
Croatian Football League players
Croatian expatriate footballers
Expatriate footballers in Ukraine
Croatian expatriate sportspeople in Ukraine